You Were Never Duckier is a 1948 Warner Bros. Merrie Melodies cartoon directed by Chuck Jones. The cartoon was released on August 7, 1948, and stars Daffy Duck and Henery Hawk.

Plot
The National Poultry Show is being held, and Daffy Duck looks at the matinee showing the prizes for the judging. The first prize for best rooster is $5,000, and the best duck is $5.00 (equivalent to  $56,756.64 and $56.76 respectively in 2021). Daffy, having traveled all the way from Dubuque for the contest, is outraged that ducks rate such a low prize and decides to disguise himself as a rooster (using rubber gloves and the tail feathers of another rooster, affixed through a plunger head) to get the $5000. Meanwhile, Henery is being taught all about roosters by his father, George K. (or G.K.) Chickenhawk (a reference to G.K. Chesterton). Henery decides to head to the poultry show and catch himself a rooster.

Daffy's plan backfires when Henery decides to take him home ("Alright seagull, are you coming wit me quietly or do I have to slap you around some?"). Daffy says he is a special breed of rooster ("a genuine pedigree Red Island Rhode Buff Orpington"), and thinking that Henery's father, described as "the greatest judge of chicken flesh in the world," is the judge to give him the $5,000, he tags along ("Hey Pop! Look at what I brung ya, look at what I brung ya. A chicken!"). Daffy then realizes he is in a chicken-hawk's house, and tries to escape, but fails as Henery closes the door. Henery's father then starts to prepare Daffy as a meal. Daffy tries to prove he is really a duck, even trying to take his disguise off (to no avail). When he tries to escape, George grabs his "head" (the rubber glove), and the glove lands on his head after Daffy ricochets and stuns him, then Daffy stuns him a bit more with his "duck laugh" and kicks to the head. Henery's now-angry father then proceeds to chase Daffy, who is finally able to escape when Henery accidentally hits George with a mallet, missing Daffy.

Getting back to the city before the contest begins, Daffy puts on another glove. Then, at the contest, Daffy proceeds to lose the best rooster prize ($5,000.00) to Henery's father George, disguised as a Rhode Island red (he obviously stole Daffy's idea). Daffy then tries for the best duck prize ($5.00), but loses that as well - to Henery, wearing a disguise consisting of a clothespin and two flippers.

Production notes
You Were Never Duckier marked the start of a direction change for Daffy, from a screwball, to a greedy, self-centered one (though, according to commentary by Eric Goldberg on the Looney Tunes Golden Collection DVD [fifth volume], this cartoon showed Daffy as being both a greedy, self-centered character and a screwball one). This cartoon was also the penultimate Henery Hawk cartoon to not be directed by Robert McKimson, and one of only three to be directed by creator Chuck Jones (after The Squawkin' Hawk and followed by The Scarlet Pumpernickel).

The title is a play on the 1942 musical film You Were Never Lovelier.

See also
 Looney Tunes and Merrie Melodies filmography (1940–1949)
 List of Daffy Duck cartoons

References

External links

1948 films
1948 animated films
1948 short films
Merrie Melodies short films
Short films directed by Chuck Jones
Daffy Duck films
Films scored by Carl Stalling
1940s Warner Bros. animated short films
Henery Hawk films